Eresus ruficapillus is a spider species found in Sicily and Croatia.

See also 
 List of Eresidae species

References 

Eresidae
Spiders of Europe
Spiders described in 1846